Plantersville may refer to:

Plantersville, Alabama, an unincorporated community
Plantersville, Mississippi, a town
Plantersville, South Carolina, an unincorporated community
Plantersville, Texas, an unincorporated community